The Havre de Grace Handicap was an American Thoroughbred horse race first run on the August 26, 1912 opening day of the new Havre de Grace Racetrack in Havre de Grace, Maryland. Although most of its runnings would take place in early fall, its final edition was run there on April 30, 1949. Due to Federal government wartime regulations, the 1943 edition was held at Laurel Park and in 1945 at Pimlico Race Course. A race for horses age three old or older, it was run on dirt over a distance of 1 1/8 miles with the exception of 1918 when it was set at 1 mile and 70 yards. From inception through 1939, the race was known as the Havre de Grace Cup Handicap.

Historical notes
The 38 runnings of the Havre de Grace Handicap produced a number of wins by racing's top horses. The 1915 edition saw Life magazine co-founder Andrew Miller win with his future U.S. Racing Hall of Fame inductee, Roamer. The 1916 winner, The Finn, had won the 1915 Belmont Stakes and earned American Champion Three-Year-Old Male Horse honors. The next year saw the 1917 Kentucky Derby winner  Omar Khayyam capture the Havre de Grace Handicap, then two years later Cudgel won. Owned by Commander J. K. L. Ross, in a very strong field Cudgel defeated two future U.S. Racing Hall of Fame inductees. The runner-up was Exterminator who was the 1918 Kentucky Derby winner, and in third place was Sir Barton, the 1919 U.S. Triple Crown champion. The 1926 race was won by another future Hall of Famer, Crusader. He beat top horses such as Display, Sarazen and Princess Doreen. Again in 1929 it was another future Hall of Famer Sun Beau who won.

The only time a mare ever won the event occurred in 1931 when Valenciennes defeated a field of eight males for owner Fannie Hertz who also owned Reigh Count, the 1928 Kentucky Derby winner and American Horse of the Year. Reigh Count would sire the great Count Fleet who would win the 1948 U.S. Triple Crown for Mrs. Hertz.

Equipoise, who too would be elected to the U.S. Racing Hall of Fame, won with his usual come-from-behind charge down the homestretch to take the 1932 race going away.

The 1938 running saw future Hall of Famer Seabiscuit put on a performance in the Havre de Grace Handicap that the New York Times described as "one of his most sensational victories." Bumped so hard at the first turn by another horse that jockey George Woolf thought he was going down, Seabiscuit regained his stride, caught up with the field, then took the lead away from the outstanding runner Menow and from there was hand-ridden to victory in a time of 1:50 flat that was just 1/5 of a second off the track record.

In 1940, Challedon would become the only horse to win the Havre de Grace Handicap twice. Ridden by George Woolf, it marked the third straight win of this race for the future Hall of Fame jockey.

Sarah F. Jeffords very fast colt Natchez added a third track record to his racing resumé with his 1948 victory in which he ran the mile and one-eighth in a clocking at 1:49 2/5.

Records
Speed record:
 1:49 2/5 @ 1 miles on dirt - Natchez (1948)

Most wins:
 2 - Challedon

Most wins by a jockey:
 3 - George Woolf (1938, 1939, 1940)

Most wins by a trainer:
 2 - Robert A. Smth (1918, 1935)
 2 - James E. Fitzsimmons (1921, 1934)
 2 - James G. Rowe Sr. (1922, 1923)
 2 - Louis J. Schaefer (1939, 1941)

Most wins by an owner:
 3 - William L. Brann / Branncastle Farm (1939, 1940, 1941)

Winners

References

Havre de Grace Racetrack
Horse races in Maryland
Discontinued horse races
1912 establishments in Maryland
1949 disestablishments in Maryland
Recurring sporting events established in 1912
Recurring sporting events disestablished in 1949
Havre de Grace, Maryland